Cresswell  railway station was a railway station located on the Stoke-Derby line at Cresswell, Staffordshire, England. It was opened by the North Staffordshire Railway in 1848 and closed in 1966.

The station was located near the Izaak Walton pub and had a substantial building and a small goods yard. It became the junction station for the Cheadle Branch Line in 1892. When the latter closed to passengers, the sidings remained in occasional use for another 20 years, mainly sand traffic from Cheadle.

The level crossing was converted to automatic barrier operation in 1989, whereupon the signal box was demolished and the junction was lifted.

There is no trace of the station today.

References

Further reading

Disused railway stations in Staffordshire
Railway stations in Great Britain closed in 1966
Railway stations in Great Britain opened in 1848
Former North Staffordshire Railway stations